Samuel Northrup was a member of the Wisconsin State Assembly.

Biography
Northrup was born on January 8, 1801. He was a resident of Dellona, Wisconsin. Northrup died on May 22, 1860 and is buried in North Freedom, Wisconsin.

Career
Nothrup was a member of the Assembly in 1858. He was a Republican.

References

People from Sauk County, Wisconsin
Republican Party members of the Wisconsin State Assembly
1801 births
1860 deaths
19th-century American politicians